Gelora is the southernmost administrative village in the Tanah Abang district of Central Jakarta, Jakarta, Indonesia. It has postal code of 10270. The country's first centralized sports complex, the Gelora Bung Karno, and the headquarters of the first television network in Indonesia, TVRI, are located in this district.

See also 
 Tanah Abang
 List of administrative villages of Jakarta

References

Administrative villages in Jakarta